Ryggebyen or Halmstad is a village in Rygge, Østfold, Norway. It had a population of 2,283 in 2015, of which 89 were in the neighboring municipality of Råde. Ryggebyen is situated along a strip with the Østfold Line on the south side and the European Road E6 and Rygge Air Station on the north side. Rygge Station and Moss Airport, Rygge are both situated at Ryggebyen.

References

Villages in Østfold
Rygge
Råde